The University High School, commonly referred to by its initials "UHS", in San Juan, Puerto Rico is a college preparatory laboratory high school operated by the Faculty of Education of the University of Puerto Rico. Located on the University of Puerto Rico, Río Piedras Campus, it provides education to approximately 514 students from 7th to 12th grade.

Campus
Its main building is a century-old art deco building located on Gándara Avenue and includes a three-story classroom annex designed in the 1970s by architect George McClintock, along with a roofed basketball court pavilion and school lunch cafeteria building (also designed by McClintock in the 1970s) shared with the UPR Elementary School.

Curriculum
UHS's faculty is composed of University of Puerto Rico professors. Students who have fulfilled their general education requirements are allowed to take college-level courses at UPR's Río Piedras campus and all students are allowed to use the José M. Lázaro general library and other campus facilities. UHS students have breakfast and lunch at the Lunchroom belonging to the University Elementary School, located next to the UHS.

Student organizations

UHS has a student council alongside several organized clubs such as a Spanish Oratory club, a Model United Nations club, an English Forensics League Club, a National Honors Society chapter, among others.

Sports
UHS has several sports teams, including a soccer team, a volleyball team, swimming team and a basketball team.

2017 University of Puerto Rico strikes
The University High School joined the University of Puerto Rico strikes on March 28, 2017. The strike was ended after a vote was held during a student assembly on May 13.

Notable alumni
 Justino Diaz, operatic bass-baritone.
Carmen Yulín Cruz, former senator and former mayor of San Juan, Puerto Rico
 Alexandra Lúgaro, independent gubernatorial candidate
 Rafael Quintero, diver.
 Hector Luis Acevedo, former mayor of San Juan and gubernatorial candidate
 José Andreu García, former Chief Justice of the Supreme Court of Puerto Rico
 Julia de Burgos, Puerto Rican poet
 Severo Colberg Toro, senator
 Alex Cora, former MLB player, current manager of the Boston Red Sox 
 Juan Manuel García Passalacqua, late political analyst
 Velda González, former Senate Vice President, actress
 Miguel Hernandez Agosto, former senator and president of the senate
 Julio Kaplan, 1967 P.R. National Chess Champion, computer scientist, founder CEO Heuristic Software
 Kenneth McClintock, Former PR Secretary of State and Senate President
 Victoria Muñoz Mendoza, former senator and gubernatorial candidate
 Marco A. Rigau, former senator
 José M. Saldaña, Puerto Rican academic and former UPR President
 Roberto Sánchez Ramos, former PR Attorney General
 Marcos Zurinaga, film director

References

External links
 Escuela Secundaria de la Universidad de Puerto Rico 
 
 

Education in San Juan, Puerto Rico
Buildings and structures in San Juan, Puerto Rico